Hunterwali Ki Beti is a Bollywood film. It was released in 1943, and is the sequel to the 1935 film Hunterwali. Both films starred Fearless Nadia as the heroine and were produced by the Wadia brothers JBH and Homi (Nadia's husband) of Wadia Movietone.It was the first Indian movie to have sequel.

References

External links
 

1943 films
1940s Hindi-language films
Indian superhero films
Indian sequel films
1940s superhero films
Indian black-and-white films